Ryan Ding Yuxi (born 20 July 1995), is a Chinese actor. He is known for playing Han Shuo in The Romance of Tiger and Rose, Dr. Zhou in Intense Love and Zhou Chuan in Moonlight.

Career

Beginnings 
In 2013, Ding Yuxi was admitted to the performance class of the Film and Television Art Department of the Shanghai Film Art Vocational College. Later, he entered the director department of the School of Continuing Education of Shanghai Theater Academy. 

On March 15, 2017, he made his debut by starring in the movie, The Game of Asura. He played the young and beautiful, fashion-loving heroine Zhou Yiyi's boyfriend Cha Jian.

Rising popularity 
In 2018, Ding gained attention for his supporting role of Dongfang Bubai in the drama New Smiling Proud Wanderer. During the same year, he participated in the variety show, PhantaCity, where guests perform an immersive performance stage, with music performance as the main form. Later that year he also participated in I Actor, a variety show where rookie actors and actresses improve their acting skills along with strengthening their morals. The strongest 8 will be chosen at the end and have a drama specially designed for them. Ding eventually won first place. 

In 2019, Ding starred in the web drama, Just an Encore. He later on starred as the male lead in the drama, Reset Life, the drama starring the 8 final winners of I Actor. 

In 2020, Ding starred in the romance drama Intense Love as a doctor. He then starred in historical romance drama The Romance of Tiger and Rose with Zhao Lusi. The series was a hit, and was praised for its interesting setup and plot. Ding started gaining increased popularity for starring in these two dramas, receiving the title of "May Boyfriend".  

In May 2021, Ding starred in the romantic comedy drama Moonlight alongside Yu Shuxin.

Filmography

Film

Television series

Variety shows

Discography

Singles

References

External links 
 Ryan Ding Yu Xi's Weibo microblog
 Ryan Ding Yu Xi's Chinese Tiktok - DouYin Account Username 3970792
 Ryan Ding Yu Xi's artist profile at Beijing Enlight Media

1995 births
Male actors from Shanghai
Living people
Chinese male film actors
Chinese male television actors
Shanghai Theatre Academy alumni
21st-century Chinese male actors